is a professional wrestling stable, currently performing in the Japanese professional wrestling promotion, World Wonder Ring Stardom. The stable is led by Utami Hayashishita and also consists of AZM, Saya Kamitani, Lady C, Hina and Miyu Amasaki.

History

Formation and Io Shirai's leadership (2016–2018)

At the final of the 2016 edition of the Goddesses of Stardom Tag League which took place on November 11, Io Shirai and Mayu Iwatani lost the decisive match to Kairi Hojo and Yoko Bito, which led to Shirai's frustration towards Iwatani, attacking her with the help of a returning Reo Hazuki (who went by HZK thereafter). Following Shirai's loss back from November 11 HZK started a feud for the Wonder of Stardom Championship against Kairi Hojo which culminated on December 9, 2016, on the fifth night of the Stardom Goddesses Of Stars event. Momo Watanabe joined the duo of Io Shirai and HZK nine days later together with the trio assuming the name Queen's Quest on November 27. On December 22, at Stardom Year-End Climax 2016, she and HZK unsuccessfully challenged the guest team of Twisted Sisters (Holidead and Thunder Rosa) for the Vendetta Pro Tag Team Championship.

Watanabe, HZK and Shirai won their first titles, the Artist of Stardom Championship on the second night of Stardom New Years Stars 2017 from January 7 by defeating Oedo Tai's Kagetsu, Viper and Kyoko Kimura who replaced Hana Kimura in the title defense. AZM joined the stable on February 11, 2017, and after seven days she teamed up with Momo Watanabe and HZK to win the vacant Artist of Stardom Championship on the second night of the Stardom Grows Up Stars event by defeating  Oedo Tai (Hana Kimura, Kagetsu and Rosa Negra) in the finals of a four-team tournament. Another combination of members under which the stable operated was portraited by HZK, Io Shirai and Piper Niven who teamed up at the Stardom Midsummer Champions event from August 13, 2017, defeating Team Jungle (Hiroyo Matsumoto, Jungle Kyona and Kaori Yoneyama) for the Artist of Stardom Championship. At the 2017 edition of the Goddesses of Stardom League which took place between October 4 and November 5, HZK and Io Shirai represented the stable, placing themselves in the A Block and scoring a total of five points after going against the teams of Jungle Kyona and Yoko Bito, Chardonnay and Scarlett, Oedo Tai (Hana Kimura and Kagetsu) and AZM who teamed up with Starlight Kid with the latter not being recognized as part of the faction.

At the Stardom New Years Stars 2018 event, the stable members competed against various notable guests. On the third night from January 6, 2018, HZK and Momo Watanabe teamed up to defeat freelancers Kay Lee Ray and Xia Brookside. One night later at the same event, AZM, HZK and Io Shirai fell short to Miranda, Nicole Savoy and Rachael Ellering in a six-man tag team match. On Stardom Gold Star event from May 23, 2018, Momo Watanabe defeated Io Shirai for the Wonder of Stardom Championship, culminating a friendly feud. On June 17, 2018, it was revealed that Shirai would leave Queen's Quest and subsequently the World Wonder Ring Stardom promotion to pursue a career in WWE.

In April, Io Shirai who was still part of the stable, travelled alongside Kairi Hojo and Mayu Iwatani to represent Stardom in the American independent scene, taking part in several events promoted by Lucha Underground and a match at the Cauliflower Alley Club.

Momo Watanabe's leadership (2018–2021) 

After her departure from Stardom, Shirai passed the leadership to Momo Watanabe. At Stardom Best Of Goddesses on November 23, 2018, Momo Watanabe teamed up with the rookie Utami Hayashishita to defeat JAN (Jungle Kyona and Natsuko Tora) for the Goddess of Stardom Championship, victory after which the latter would join the stable.

On January 19, 2020, at the Stardom 9th Anniversary, Bea Priestley teamed up with Oedo Tai's Jamie Hayter to defeat Tokyo Cyber Squad's Jungle Kyona and Konami for the Goddess of Stardom Championship, marking the first time when two cross-faction members held titles together. Priestley later turned heel on the stable on the same night, joining Oedo Tai. However it was not the first time when one of the stable members teamed up with components of other factions. Momo Watanabe would often wrestle alongside Jungle Kyona under the name of JGKReeeeN beginning with the start of 2016, and briefly continuing their partnership even after Watanabe joined Queen's Quest. Their last match as a team took place at Stardom 9th Anniversary In Osaka on March 28, 2020, where they defeated Kagetsu and Mayu Iwatani. At the Stardom Cinderella Tournament 2020 on March 24, 2020, AZM, Saya Kamitani, Utami Hayashishita and Momo Watanabe competed in the tournament but only Watanabe reached the quarter-finals where she fell short to Giulia. At Stardom Cinderella Summer In Tokyo on July 26, 2020, Hina unsuccessfully faced Saki Kashima, Momo Watanabe defeated Maika, AZM defeated Riho and Starlight Kid to win the High Speed Championship, and Saya Kamitani teamed up with Utami Hayashishita to defeat Tokyo Cyber Squad (Jungle Kyona and Konami) for the vacant Goddess of Stardom Championship. On September 28, 2020, at Stardom 5Star Special, AZM, Momo Watanabe and Utami Hayashishita unsuccessfully competed against returning guest performers Rin Kadokura, Takumi Iroha and Mei Hoshizuki in a six-man tag team match. At the 2020 edition of the Goddesses of Stardom Tag League, Utami Hayashishita and Saya Kamitani participated under the sub-group of AphrOditE and AZM teaming up with Momo Watanabe as MOMOAZ. The latter team won the finals of the tournament on November 8, 2020, after defeating Donna Del Mondo's Giulia and Maika who went under the name of Grab The Top.

Utami Hayashishita defeated Mayu Iwatani for the World of Stardom Championship at Sendai Cinderella on November 15, 2020, therefore she subsequently became the new topstar and main focus of the stable, while Momo Watanabe remained the official leader. She was acknowledged as the leader of Queen's Quest by Hayashishita after their title match on December 20, 2020.

At the 10th Anniversary of Stardom from March 3, 2021, AZM dropped the High Speed Championship to Natsupoi, Momo Watanabe unsuccessfully challenged Nanae Takahashi, and Utami Hayashishita defeated Saya Kamitani for the World of Stardom Championship in an inter-stable clash. At Stardom Yokohama Dream Cinderella from April 4, 2021, Hina defeated AZM and Lady C in a three-way match, Momo Watanabe picked up a victory over Mina Shirakawa, Saya Kamitani over Unagi Sayaka, and Utami Hayashishita once again defended the World of Stardom Championship successfully against former stable member Bea Priestley, match which was the last for the latter in the promotion. On the first night of the Stardom Cinderella Tournament 2021 which took place on April 10, Hina defeated Lady C in a singles match, AZM fell short to Rina and Momo Watanabe to Starlight Kid Cinderella Tournament First-round match, while Utami Hayashishita scored a victory over Mina Shirakawa and Saya Kamitani over Tam Nakano in the same tournament stages. On the second night from May 14, Momo Watanabe, AZM and Hina teamed up and unsuccessfully challenged Oedo Tai (Natsuko Tora, Konami and Gokigen Death) in a Six-woman tag team match, Saya Kamitani defeated Starlight Kid in a second-round match, while Utami Hayashishita fell short to Syuri. On the third night Utami Hayashishita successfully defended the World of Stardom Championship against Syuri due to going against her in two matches, one of them ending up in a thirty-minute time limit draw which restarted. The second match ended with both Hayashishita and Syuri falling to a ten-count. Saya Kamitani won the 2021 Cinderella Tournament by defeating Himeka in the semi-finals and Maika in the final match. She issued a challenge to Tam Nakano for the Wonder of Stardom Championship as her granted whish for winning the competition. At Yokohama Dream Cinderella 2021 in Summer on July 4, Momo Watanabe and AZM defeated Starlight Kid and Ruaka, and Utami Hayashishita successfully defended the World of Stardom Championship by doctor stoppage after Natsuko Tora sustained a knee injury during the match. For the Stardom 5 Star Grand Prix 2021, Utami Hayashishita, Saya Kamitani, AZM and Momo Watanabe were listed as participants of the tournament. On the finals of the event from September 25, Momo Watanabe fell short to Syuri. At Stardom 10th Anniversary Grand Final Osaka Dream Cinderella from October 9, 2021, Momo Watanabe, AZM and Saya Kamitani unsuccessfully challenged MaiHimePoi (Maika, Himeka and Natsupoi) for the Artist of Stardom Championship and Utami Hayashishita secured another defense of the World of Stardom Championship against Takumi Iroha. At Kawasaki Super Wars, the first event of the Stardom Super Wars trilogy which took place on November 3, 2021, Maika battled Mina Shirakawa and Saya Kamitani in a three-way match, Syuri successfully defended her SWA World Championship and the World of Stardom Championship challenge rights certificate successfully against AZM, Momo Watanabe battled Starlight Kid in a time-limit draw for the High Speed Championship and Utami Hayashishita successfully defended her World of Stardom title against Hazuki. At Tokyo Super Wars, the second part of the trilogy which took place on November 27, Momo Watanabe teamed up with AZM to defeat the makeshift team of Unagi Sayaka and Lady C, Saya Kamitani defeated Himeka and Natsupoi in a three-way match to become the number one contender for the Wonder of Stardom Championship and Utami Hayashishita successfully defended the World of Stardom title against Maika.

Momo Watanabe incident (December 2021)
Momo Watanabe had been the victim of Starlight Kid's mind games as the latter's strategy to gain more recruits into Oedo Tai since the November 3 show of the Stardom Super Wars. Their feud degenerated into an eight-woman elimination tag team match in which both of them would be the captains of their respective teams. The loser captain would be forced to join the enemy unit and if Kid lost she would also have to unmask. The match took place on December 18, at Osaka Super Wars, the event which represented the last part of the "Super Wars" trilogy. With the match coming down to the wire and Queen's Quest holding a 2 to 1 advantage over Starlight Kid a shocking moment occurred when Momo Watanabe betrayed her faction and hit her long-time tag team partner AZM over the head with a chair, handing the win to Oedo Tai and anointing herself the “Black Peach” of the group. Watanabe became the first leader of a Stardom faction to betray their own unit.

Post-Momo Watanabe period (December 2021-May 2022)

At Stardom Dream Queendom on December 29, 2021, AZM unsuccessfully challenged Starlight Kid and Koguma in a three-way match for the High Speed Championship, Saya Kamitani defeated Tam Nakano to win the Wonder of Stardom Championship and Utami Hayashishita dropped the World of Stardom Championship to Syuri with her reign coming to an end at 409 days.

At Stardom Award in Shinjuku on January 3, 2022, AZM, Kamitani and Hayashishita engaged in a brawl with Oedo Tai after their match against Fukigen Death, Saki Kashima and Ruaka. Obviously outnumbered, the three members of Queen's Quest reveiced help from Lady C who rushed down the ring to try to save them. After Oedo Tai retreated, Hayashishita offered C a spot into the unit which the latter accepted so she was later announced to join the stable in the process. On January 9, 2022, at Stardom in Korakuen Hall, Saya Kamitani, Utami Hayashishta and Lady C unsuccessfully wrestled Oedo Tai's Rina, Momo Watanabe, Starlight Kid and Ruaka in a 4-on-3 handicap match. After their loss, the Queen's Quest members announced they will no longer wear their masks as they will move forward and away from the Momo Watanabe era. At Stardom Nagoya Supreme Fight on January 29, 2022, Utami Hayashishita and AZM battled Oedo Tai's Momo Watanabe and Starlight Kid in a losing effort as a result of a grudge tag team match, Lady C unsuccessfully challenged Hanan for the Future of Stardom Championship and Saya Kamitani defended the Wonder of Stardom Championship successfully against Unagi Sayaka. At Stardom Cinderella Journey on February 23, 2022, Utami Hayashishita teamed up with Lady C in a losing effort against Momo Watanabe and Ruaka, AZM defeated Starlight Kid to win the High Speed Championship and Saya Kamitani successfully defended the Wonder of Stardom Championship against Natsupoi. At Stardom New Blood 1 on March 11, 2022, Saya Kamitani teamed up with Lady C going into a time-limit draw against Mirai and Mai Sakurai, and then in the main event, Utami Hayashishita defeated a debuting Miyu Amasaki. Despite the latter's loss, Hayashishita was impressed by Amasaki's performance and invited her to join Queen's Quest, request which Amasaki accepted. On the first night of the Stardom World Climax 2022 from March 26, AZM, Lady C and Miyu Amasaki unsuccessfully competed in a six-woman tag team gauntlet match, and Saya Kamitani successfully defended the Wonder of Stardom Championship against Utami Hayashishita. On the second night from March 27, Lady C and Miyu Amasaki participated in a 18-women Cinderella Rumble match won by Mei Suruga and also involving other opponents from both Stardom and the independent scene such as Tomoka Inaba, Haruka Umesaki, Nanami, Maria, Ai Houzan, and Yuna Mizumori. Utami Hayashishita defeated Mirai by submission, AZM retained her High Speed Championship against Koguma and Natsupoi, and Saya Kamitani retained the Wonder of Stardom Championship against Tam Nakano. At Stardom Cinderella Tournament 2022, all the members participated in the competition with AZM and Saya Kamitani scoring the best results by making it to the second rounds. On the last night of the event from April 29, Utami Hayashishita, Saya Kamitani & Lady C teamed up in a gauntlet match won by Tam Nakano, Mina Shirakawa and Unagi Sayaka, and AZM successfully defended the High Speed Championship against Mei Suruga. At Stardom Golden Week Fight Tour on May 5, 2022, Hina defeated Waka Tsukiyama in the preshow, Utami Hayashishita, AZM and Lady C lost again to Tam Nakano, Mina Shirakawa and Unagi Sayaka, and Saya Kamitani retained the Wonder of Stardom Championship over Maika. At Stardom New Blood 2 on May 13, 2022, Hina teamed up with Hanan and went into a time-limit draw against JTO (Tomoka Inaba and Aoi).

Utami Hayashishita's leadership (May 2022-present)

On May 15, 2022, a five-way match between Lady C, AZM, Saya Kamitani, Hina and Utami Hayashishita took place to determine the new leader of the unit, to end the leaderless period of almost six months after Momo Watanabe's defection to Oedo Tai. Hayashishita won the match, therefore becoming the fourth (AZM was said to be the third de facto leader "see notes list") and elected leader of the stable. At Stardom Flashing Champions on May 28, 2022, Lady C teamed up with Momo Kohgo and Saya Iida to defeat stablemate Hina who teamed up with Rina and Ami Sourei, AZM retained the High Speed Championship against Thekla, Utami Hayashishita and Miyu Amasaki fell short to Tam Nakano and Kairi, and Saya Kamitani retained the Wonder of Stardom Championship against 2022 Cinderella Tournament winner Mirai. At Stardom Fight in the Top on June 26, 2022, Miyu Amasaki and Lady C fell short to Momo Kohgo and Saya Iida, and Utami Hayashishita, Saya Kamitani and AZM took part in one of the first steel cage matches ever promoted by Stardom where they fell short to Mayu Iwatani, Koguma and Hazuki. At Stardom New Blood 3, on July 8, 2022, Miyu Amasaki fell short to Giulia in the main event. At Mid Summer Champions in Tokyo, the first event of the Stardom Mid Summer Champions which took place on July 9, 2022, Lady C defeated Hina and Yuko Sakurai in a three-way match, Utami Hayashishita and Miyu Amasaki fell short to Ami Sourei and Mirai, AZM successfully defended the High Speed Championship against Momo Kohgo and Saya Kamitani successfully defended the Wonder of Stardom Championship against Starlight Kid. At Stardom in Showcase vol.1 on July 23, 2022, Hina, Lady C and Miyu Amasaki participated in a rumble match in which Amasaki was the runner up, and Saya Kamitani unsuccessfully competed in a casket match also involving Starlight Kid and a reaper masked figure which was revealed to be Yuu. At Mid Summer Champions in Tokyo, the first event of the Stardom Mid Summer Champions which took place on July 9, 2022, Lady C defeated Hina and Waka Tsukiyama in a three-way match, Utami Hayashishita and Miyu Amasaki fell short to Ami Sourei and Mirai, AZM retained the High Speed Championship over Momo Kohgo, and Saya Kamitani successfully defended the Wonder of Stardom Championship against Saki. At Mid Summer Champions in Nagoya on July 24, AZM successfully defended the High Speed Championship against Rina, Lady C, Hina and Miyu Amasaki unsuccessfully competed in a three-way tag team match, and Saya Kamitani successfully defended the Wonder of Stardom Championship against Saki. At Stardom x Stardom: Nagoya Midsummer Encounter on August 21, 2022, Miyu Amasaki unsuccessfully challenged Hanan for the Future of Stardom Championship, Hina fell short to Maika, Utami Hayashishita, AZM and Lady C defeated Mayu Iwatani, Saya Iida and Momo Kohgo, and Saya Kamitani successfully defended the Wonder of Stardom Championship against Himeka. At Stardom New Blood 4 on August 26, 2022, Hina fell short to Tomoka Inaba, Lady C competed in a three-way match won by Ruaka and also involving Chie Koishikawa and Miyu Amasaki main evented the show by falling short to Tam Nakano. At Stardom in Showcase vol.2 on September 25, 2022, AZM alongside Mayu Iwatani and Ram Kaicho defeated Maika in a Falls Count Anywhere Four-Way Match, and Utami Hayashishita and Lady C teamed up with Syuri as Rossy Ogawa's Bodyguard Army, falling short to Grim Reaper Army (Yuu, Nanae Takahashi & Yuna Manase). At Stardom New Blood 5 on October 19, 2022, Lady C and Hina fell short to Suzu Suzuki and Ancham. At Hiroshima Goddess Festival on November 3, 2022, AZM defeated Waka Tsukiyama, Lady C, Miyu Amasaki and Saya Iida in a five-way match, Utami Hayashishita defeated Natsuko Tora in a revenge match that concluded their feud which abruptly stopped on July 4, 2021 at Stardom Yokohama Dream Cinderella 2021 where Tora got injured, and Saya Kamitani successfullt defended the Wonder of Stardom Championship against Mina Shirakawa. At Stardom Gold Rush on November 19, 2022, Lady C and Miyu Amasaki unsuccessfully competed in a three-way tag team match won by Natsuko Tora and Ruaka, and also involving Saya Iida and Momo Kohgo, AZM successfully defended the High Speed Championship against Momoka Hanazono, Saya Kamitani successfully defended the Wonder of Stardom Championship against Kairi, and Utami Hayashishita unsuccessfully challenged Syuri for the World of Stardom Championship. At Stardom in Showcase vol.3 on November 26, 2022, AZM fought into a four-way match resembling the 2022 FIFA World Cup season won by Koguma and also involving Starlight Kid and Ram Kaicho, Lady C defeated Saya Kamitani, Himeka and Momo Kohgo to get a free haircut from the event's sponsor "ZEST", and Utami Hayashishita and Hina teamed up with Mirai in a losing effort against Mayu Iwatani, Hanan and Maika in a "judo rules match". At Stardom Dream Queendom 2 on December 29, 2022, Lady C, Hina and Miyu Amasaki participated in a stardom rambo, AZM defeated Hikari Shimizu to retain the High Speed Championship, Utami Hayashishita went into a time-limit draw against Kairi and Saya Kamitani successfully defended the Wonder of Stardom Championship against Haruka Umesaki.

At Stardom New Blood 7 on January 20, 2023, Hina and Lady C fell short to Mai Sakurai and Chanyota in the quarterfinals of the inaugural New Blood Tag Team Championship. At Stardom Supreme Fight 2023 on February 4, 2023, Miyu Amasaki competed in a call your shot for a championship of choice match, Utami Hayashishita, AZM and Lady C fell short to Konami, Syuri and Ami Sourei, and Saya Kamitani successfully defended the Wonder of Stardom Championship against Momo Watanabe.

Independent circuit (2017–present) 

Over time, various members of the stable worked beyond Stardom for other promotions. On September 4, 2017, at K-DOJO Taka Michinoku 25th Anniversary, an event promoted by Kaientai Dojo, HZK teamed up with Io Shirai to defeat Bambi and Erina. At Tokyo Gurentai Lucha Libre Fiesta, an event produced by Stardom in partnership with Tokyo Gurentai, AZM, Momo Watanabe and Utami Hayashishita represented Queen's Quest in a four-way tag team elimination match also involving STARS (Saki Kashima, Starlight Kid and Tam Nakano), Oedo Tai (Andras Miyagi, Hazuki and Kagetsu) and JAN (Jungle Kyona, Natsuko Tora and Saya Iida). At Assemble Vol. 2, an event produced by Women's Pro-Wrestling Assemble in partnership with Stardom on November 10, 2020, AZM teamed up with Saya Kamitani to defeat STARS (Starlight Kid and Saya Iida).

New Japan Pro Wrestling (2021-present)
In time, various members of the stable competed in pay-per-views promoted by NJPW. On January 5, 2021, on the second night of Wrestle Kingdom 15, the biggest annual event promoted by New Japan Pro Wrestling, AZM, Saya Kamitani and Utami Hayashishita competed in an exhibition match against Donna Del Mondo's Himeka, Maika and Natsupoi, which they won. On the first night of the Wrestle Grand Slam in MetLife Dome from September 4, Momo Watanabe and Saya Kamitani teamed up to defeat with Lady C and Maika. Giulia and Syuri were also announced to compete on the second night against Watanabe and Kamitani. On the second night of Wrestle Kingdom 16 on January 5, 2022, Saya Kamitani teamed up with Tam Nakano to defeat Mayu Iwatani and Starlight Kid in a tag team match. At Historic X-Over on November 20, 2022, Hina and Miyu Amasaki competed in the Stardom Rambo, Saya Kamitani, AZM and Lady C defeated Thekla, Himeka and Mai Sakurai, and Utami Hayashishita teamed up with Hiroshi Tanahashi to defeat Maika and Hirooki Goto in a mixed tag team match.

Members

Current

Former

Sub-groups

Current

Former
{|class="wikitable sortable" style="text-align:center;"
|-
!Affiliate
!Members
!Tenure 
!Type
|-
|MOMOAZ
|Momo WatanabeAZM
|2017–2021
|Tag team
|-
|Momo Watanabe and Utami Hayashishita
|Momo WatanabeUtami Hayashishita
|2018–2019
|Tag team
|-
|Bea Priestley and Jamie Hayter
|Bea PriestleyJamie Hayter
|2020
|Tag team
|-
|JKGReeeeN
|Momo WatanabeJungle Kyona
|2018–2020
|Tag team
|-
|Queen's Quest UK
|Bea PriestleyViperChardonnay|2018–2020
|Sub-unit
|-
|}

Timeline

 Championships and accomplishments 
 Pro Wrestling IllustratedSingles wrestlers
 Ranked Utami Hayashishita No. 2 of the top 150 female singles wrestlers in the PWI Women's 150 in 2021
 Ranked Io Shirai No. 6 of the top 50 female singles wrestlers in the PWI Women's 50 in 2017
 Ranked Saya Kamitani No. 7 of the top 150 female singles wrestlers in the PWI Women's 150 in 2022
 Ranked AZM No. 15 of the top 150 female singles wrestlers in the PWI Women's 150 in 2022
 Ranked Bea Priestley No. 20 of the top 100 female singles wrestlers in the PWI Women's 100 in 2019
 Ranked Momo Watanabe No. 32 of the top 100 female singles wrestlers in the PWI Women's 100 in 2020
 Ranked Viper No. 37 of the top 100 female singles wrestlers in the PWI Women's 100 in 2018
Tag team wrestlers
 Ranked Momo Watanabe, Utami Hayashishita, AZM and Saya Kamitani No. 20 of the top 50 tag teams in the PWI Tag Team's 50 of 2020
 Pro-Wrestling: EVE
 Pro-Wrestling: EVE International Championship (1 time) – Utami Hayashishita
 Tokyo Sports Women's Wrestling Grand Prize 
 Newcomer Award 
World Wonder Ring Stardom
World of Stardom Championship (3 times) – Io Shirai (1), Bea Priestley (1) and Utami Hayashishita (1)
Wonder of Stardom Championship (3 times, current) – Io Shirai (1),  Momo Watanabe (1) and Saya Kamitani (1, current)
Goddess of Stardom Championship (3 times) – Momo Watanabe and Utami Hayashishita (1), Saya Kamitani and Utami Hayashishita (1) and Bea Priestley and Jamie Hayter'' (1)
Artist of Stardom Championship (5 times) – AZM, HZK and Io Shirai (2); AZM, Momo Watanabe and Utami Hayashishita (1); HZK, Io Shirai and Momo Watanabe (1); HZK, Io Shirai and Viper (1)
High Speed Championship (2 times, current) – AZM
Future of Stardom Championship (1 time) – Utami Hayashishita
SWA World Championship (2 times) – Viper (1) and Utami Hayashishita (1)
5★Star GP (2020) – Utami Hayashishita
Stardom Cinderella Tournament
 (2018) – Momo Watanabe
(2021) – Saya Kamitani
Goddesses of Stardom Tag League (2018) – Utami Hayashishita and Momo Watanabe
Goddesses of Stardom Tag League (2020) – AZM and Momo Watanabe
 5★Star GP Award (7 times)
 5★Star GP Best Match Award 
 (2022) – 
 (2020) – 
 (2017) – 
 (2016) – 
 5★Star GP Outstanding Performance Award (2021) 
 5★Star GP Finalist Award (2021) 
 5★Star GP Fighting Spirit Award (2022) 
 Stardom Year-End Award (13 times)
Best Tag Team Award 
Best Technique Award 
Most Valuable Player Award 
 Match Of The Year 
Outstanding Performance Award 
 Rookie of Stardom (2018)

Luchas de Apuestas record

Notes

See also
Neo Stardom Army
Donna Del Mondo
Cosmic Angels
God's Eye
Oedo Tai
Stars

References

External links 

 

Independent promotions teams and stables
Japanese promotions teams and stables
Women's wrestling teams and stables
World Wonder Ring Stardom teams and stables